Donald Milton Clarke (born 1940) is an American writer on music.

Career 
Clarke was born in 1940 and raised in Kenosha, Wisconsin. From 1959 through 1969, he worked at a car factory in Kenosha American Motors Corporation. In 1973, Clarke graduated from the University of Wisconsin–Madison with a Bachelor of Science in education with honors. He lived in England from 1973 to 1998, during which, from 1974 to 1979, he worked with Marshall Cavendish Publications. Beginning around 1998–1999, Clarke lived in Austin, Texas, for five years. He moved to West Des Moines, Iowa, in 2003, where he worked for a time on the music e-zines BluesWax and FolkWax. He then moved to Allentown, Pennsylvania in 2009, and in 2014, to Colorado Springs.

Clarke was the author/editor of the Penguin Encyclopedia of Popular Music (1989, 1998) which is now available free on his website (donaldclarkemusicbox.com). Clarke's other books include Wishing On The Moon: The Life and Times of Billie Holiday (1994), The Rise And Fall Of Popular Music (1995), and All Or Nothing At All: A Life Of Frank Sinatra (1997). The Billie Holiday biography was reprinted by Da Capo Press in 2000 under the title Billie Holiday: Wishing On The Moon.

Selected work 
Books

  ;  (hardback),  (paperback).
  ; 
  .
  ; ; ; .

Articles

   (2nd ed; 2002); ; .

References

External links
 Schwartz, Steve (2000) (The rise and Fall of Popular Music)
 Schwartz, Steve (2001) ''All or Nothing at All: A Life of Frank Sinatra)

1940 births
Living people
American music critics
University of Wisconsin–Madison alumni
Writers about music
American expatriates in the United Kingdom